HMS Necker was the armed transport Necker or Neker that  captured off the Cape of Good Hope on 25 October 1781. She captured the transports and brought them to Saint Helena. Necker may have been a flute that served the French navy from 1779 to 1781, but for which there is no information other than her existence.

Hannibal took Necker to Saint Helena. There Commander Charles Carpenter commissioned Necker as a sixth rate, with a crew drawn from Hannibal. She was sent to the East Indies to augment the British naval forces there.

She disappeared, presumed foundered, circa December 1781 on her way from Saint Helena to the East Indies.

See also
List of people who disappeared mysteriously at sea

Citations

References
 
 
 
 
 

1780s missing person cases
1781 ships
Captured ships
Missing ships
People lost at sea
Ships built in France
Sixth rates of the Royal Navy
Warships lost with all hands